Saito sensei may refer to:

 Morihiro Saito, aikido teacher
 Hitohiro Saito, aikido teacher, son of Morihiro Saito